Mac Forehand (born August 4, 2001) is an American freestyle skier who competes internationally.

He competed in the FIS Freestyle Ski and Snowboarding World Championships 2021, where he placed fourth in men's ski big air.

He competed at the 2022 Winter Olympics.

References

External links

2001 births
Living people
American male freestyle skiers
Freestyle skiers at the 2022 Winter Olympics
Olympic freestyle skiers of the United States
X Games athletes